Joseph Henry Garbutt (21 October 1878 – 22 September 1948) was an Australian rules footballer who played with South Melbourne in the Victorian Football League (VFL).

Notes

External links 

1878 births
1948 deaths
Australian rules footballers from Victoria (Australia)
Sydney Swans players
Port Melbourne Football Club players